Sumichrast's wren (Hylorchilus sumichrasti), also known as the slender-billed wren, is a species of bird in the family Troglodytidae. It is endemic to Mexico.

Taxonomy and systematics

Sumichrast's wren is monotypic. A former subspecies, Hylorchilus sumichrasti navai was elevated to species status as Nava's wren in the 1990s.

The common name of this species commemorates the Mexican naturalist François Sumichrast.

Description

The adults have uniform deep brown crowns, napes, and backs; their rumps are a sooty brown. Their chin and throat are buff that deepens through the breast into the flanks and belly. The breast has faint dark bars and the belly has tiny white dots. The juvenile is similar, but its throat has a dirty look and faint dusky scales, its underparts are darker, and the breast and belly markings are fainter.

Distribution and habitat

Sumichrast's wren occurs in a small area of Mexico, from central Veracruz into northern Oaxaca. It inhabits the understory of humid forest, both evergreen and semi-deciduous, and also shady coffee plantations. However, it is found only in scattered sites that have extensive limestone outcroppings.

Behavior

Feeding

The diet of Sumichrast's wren is primarily arthropods and other invertebrates such as snails and worms, and also includes small fruit as a minor component. It forages on and very near the ground with hops and short flights, probing into crevices for prey and occasionally snatching a flying insect that passes it.

Breeding

Active Sumichrast's wren nests have been found in May. The nest is a cup made of grass, roots, and other materials and placed in a cave or crevice. Both sexes provide the materials but only the female builds it. The clutch size is three. The male brings food to the female during incubation and both sexes provision nestlings.

Vocalization

The male Sumichrast's wren sings "a varied descending series of loud, rich whistles" . The female sings "a simple phrase consisting of a single repeated syllable".

Status

The IUCN has assessed Sumichrast's wren as Near Threatened. "This species has a small range and a moderately small population. Both its range and population are probably in decline owing to increasing habitat loss and degradation."

References

External links
Image at ADW

Sumichrast's wren
Sumichrast's wren
Taxonomy articles created by Polbot